Radian is an Austrian experimental music group.

Their music touches on instrumental rock, post-rock, jazz and electronica, and is notable for imitating some of the more demanding musical structures of intelligent dance music.

The trio was formed in 1996, in Vienna.

Members 

 1996-2011

Martin Brandlmayr: drums, vibraphone, editing and arrangement

Stefan Nemeth: synthesizer, guitars

John Norman: bass

 2011-

Martin Brandlmayr: drums, vibraphone, electronics, editing and arrangement

Martin Siewert: guitar, electronics

John Norman: bass

Discography 

Radian EP (1998) - Rhiz
tg11 (2000) - Mego / Rhiz
rec.extern (2002) - Thrill Jockey (recorded by John McEntire)
Juxtaposition (2004) - Thrill Jockey
Chimeric (2009) - Thrill Jockey
Radian Verses Howe Gelb (2014) - Radian Releases (collaboration with Howe Gelb)
On Dark Silent Off (2016) - Thrill Jockey

External links
Official website

Austrian musical groups
Musical groups from Vienna